Mike Donovan (born 6 October 1971) is an American, San Francisco, California based musician, best known as the guitarist and singer of Sic Alps (2004-2013).   He has also released music by other San Francisco musicians with his Dial Records and Folding Cassettes labels.  

Donovan is a veteran of several other bands.  He was a member of The Ropers, The Church Steps with Chris Douglas, NAM, Big Techno Werewolves, Sounds of the Barbary Coast and Yikes.

In October 2013, he released his solo debut Wot on Drag City.

In May 2015, Donovan formed the San Francisco lo-fi supergroup The Peacers, releasing a self-titled debut on July 17, 2015.  The self-titled album was co-produced and co-performed by Ty Segall. The current lineup of The Peacers is Mike Donovan, Shayde Sartin, Mike Shoun and Bo Moore. The band release their second record, Introducing The Crimsmen, on Drag City on June 16, 2017.

Discography

 Wot (Drag City, 2013)
 How To Get Your Record Played In Shops (Drag City, 2018)
 Exurbian Quonset (Drag City, 2019)

References

External links
 Peacers website

1971 births
American rock musicians
Living people